Émile Jean-Horace Vernet (30 June 178917 January 1863), more commonly known as simply Horace Vernet, was a French painter of battles, portraits, and Orientalist subjects.

Biography

Vernet was born to Carle Vernet, another famous painter, who was himself a son of Claude Joseph Vernet. He was born in the Paris Louvre, while his parents were staying there during the French Revolution. Vernet quickly developed a disdain for the high-minded seriousness of academic French a work which was distinguished by art influenced by Classicism, and decided to paint subjects taken mostly from contemporary life. During his early career, when Napoleon Bonaparte was in power, he began depicting the French soldier in a more familiar, vernacular manner rather than in an idealized, Davidian fashion; he was just twenty when he exhibited the Taking of an Entrenched Camp Some other of his paintings that represent French soldiers in a more direct, less idealizing style, include Dog of the Regiment, Trumpeter's Horse, and Death of Poniatowski.

He gained recognition during the Bourbon Restoration for a series of battle paintings commissioned by the duc d'Orleans, the future King Louis-Philippe. Critics marvelled at the incredible speed with which he painted. Many of his paintings made during this early phase of his career were "noted for their historical accuracy as well as their charged landscapes." Examples of paintings in this style include his Four Battles series: The Battle of Jemappes (1821), The Battle of Montmirail (1822), The Battle of Hanau (1824), and The Battle of Valmy (1826). Enjoying equal favour with the court and with the opposition, he was appointed director of the French Academy in Rome, from 1829 to 1835.

Over the course of his long career, Horace Vernet was honoured with dozens of important commissions. King Louis-Philippe was one of his most prolific patrons, and the whole of the Constantine room at the Palace of Versailles was decorated by him, in the short space of three years. The King requested that he paint a gallery dedicated to the "fruits of colonization". At the time, France was colonizing Algeria through war, and claiming it to be part of their mission civilisatrice, or their "civilizing mission". In a neoclassical style, reflecting the Roman colonization in North Africa about 2000 years before, Horace painted pictures of French non-commissioned officers training Algerian soldiers, French engineers building Algerian roads, and French soldiers tilling Algerian fields.

His depictions of Algerian battles, such as the Capture of the Smahla and the Capture of Constantine, were well received by other French people, as they were vivid depictions of their army in the heat of battle. After the fall of the July Monarchy during the Revolution of 1848, Vernet discovered a new patron in Napoléon III of France. He accompanied the French Army during the Crimean War, producing several paintings, truthfully including one of the Battle of the Alma, which was not as well received as his earlier paintings. One well known and possibly apocryphal anecdote maintains that when Vernet was asked to remove a certain obnoxious general from one of his paintings, he replied, "I am a painter of history, sire, and I will not violate the truth," hence demonstrating his fidelity to representing war.

Vernet also developed an interest in daguerreotype photography. He took photographs in Egypt as reference material for his paintings, and during a stop at Malta in March 1840 while en route to Egypt, he took the earliest known photographs of the island at Fort Manoel. Today these early photographs are believed to be lost.

Vernet died in his hometown of Paris in 1863.

Literary references

In Arthur Conan Doyle's Sherlock Holmes story "The Adventure of the Greek Interpreter", Holmes claims to be related to Vernet, stating, "My ancestors were country squires... my grandmother... was the sister of Vernet, the French artist.", without further clarifying whether this is Claude Joseph Vernet, Carle Vernet, or Horace Vernet.

Gallery

References

Further reading

 Dayot, Armand (1898). Les Vernet : Joseph—Carle—Horace. Paris: A. Magnier.
 Harkett, Daniel and Katie Hornstein, eds, (2017). Horace Vernet and the Thresholds of Nineteenth-Century Visual Culture. Dartmouth College Press/University Press of New England. 
 Ruutz-Rees, Janet E. (Janet Emily) (1880). Horace Vernet. New York: Scribner and Welford.
 Sessions, Jennifer E. (2011), By Sword and Plow: France and the Conquest of Algeria. Cornell University Press.

1789 births
1863 deaths
18th-century French painters
19th-century French painters
Painters from Paris
Burials at Montmartre Cemetery
French male painters
Knights of the Holy Sepulchre
Members of the Académie des beaux-arts
Recipients of the Pour le Mérite (civil class)
Orientalist painters
Military art
19th-century French photographers
Pioneers of photography
18th-century French male artists
French war artists